These are the complete European Championship and World Championship Grand Prix results for Automobiles Ettore Bugatti, the works Bugatti team.

Grand Prix results

Complete European Championship results
(key) (results in bold indicate pole position, results in italics indicate fastest lap)

 † Indicates shared drive, no points for the driver who took over

Grandes Épreuves results
(key)

Complete Formula One results
(key) (Results in bold indicate pole position; results in italics indicate fastest lap)

1 The World Constructors' Championship was not awarded before 1958.

Racing victories

References

Formula One constructor results
Bugatti